"Run" is a song written by American singer-songwriter Matt Nathanson with Jennifer Nettles and Kristian Bush of country duo Sugarland, and recorded for Nathanson's seventh studio album, Modern Love (2011). The song is performed as a duet between Nathanson and Nettles, with Bush contributing backing vocals as well as the acoustic and electric guitar accompaniments. It made its debut at the 2010 CMA Awards on November 9, 2011. A remastered country version was released to digital retailers via Vanguard Records the same day as the third single from Modern Love.

Background and release
"Run" was released to digital retails on November 9, 2011 through Vanguard Records. It was serviced to hot adult contemporary radio on January 16, 2012 through Vanguard and Capitol Records.

Accreditation of the song varies, with AllMusic crediting Bush and Nettles separately as featured artists, the iTunes Store crediting Sugarland collectively, and the digital single attributing the song to Sugarland as the primary artist and Nathanson as a featured artist.

Critical reception
Bobby Peacock of Roughstock gave a positive review of "Run", which he declared "at its core... boils down to a country lyric," commenting that "the seemingly different voices (not to mention musical backgrounds) unite perfectly, helped by a slick (but in a good way), powerful pop production." PopCrush reviewer Scott Shetler deemed "Run" inferior to Nettles' previous pop/rock collaboration (Bon Jovi's "Who Says You Can't Go Home"), but consented that "Run" was a "pleasant pop song with a decent hook and nice harmonies" and ultimately ranked the song 3.5/5 stars. Billy Dukes of Taste of Country described "Run" as a "stop-and-thinker that could easily be dismissed if listened to haphazardly" due to the hidden depths of the lyrics, and lauded the combination of Nathanson and Nettles' voices: "Not since Jon Bon Jovi has a male lead complimented Nettles’ beckoning drawl so naturally." Andrew Leahey of AllMusic was more critical of the song and Nettles' vocals in particular, leading him to label "Run" as "one of the album’s most misguided moves".

Music videos
Three official music videos exist for "Run". The Sugarland version was directed by Valarie Allyn Bienas and premiered February 9, 2012. This video feature live footage from the CMA Awards performance. A solo Matt Nathanson video premiered March 27, 2012 and a collaborative video (titled "Run ft. Sugarland") premiered the following day on March 28, 2012; the latter video was directed by Brendan Walter.

Chart performance

Release history

References

2011 songs
2011 singles
Matt Nathanson songs
Sugarland songs
Vanguard Records singles
Songs written by Jennifer Nettles
Songs written by Kristian Bush
Vocal collaborations